The People's Liberation Army Naval Medical University, also known as the PLA Second Military Medical University (SMMU), is a public university in Shanghai, China. It was founded in September 1949 and named in July 1951. It is a national key university supported by the state Project 211. It is a Chinese state Double First Class University, included in the national Double First Class University Plan. As of 2022, the Second Military Medical University is ranked between top 601-700 among world universities according to the Academic Ranking of World Universities.

It was previously called People's Medical College of the East China Military Commanding Region.

Affiliated hospitals 
 Changhai Hospital (First Affiliated hospital)
 Changzheng Hospital (Second Affiliated hospital)
 Eastern Hepatobiliary Surgery Hospital (Third Affiliated hospital)

References

External links 
  Second Military Medical University Official website

Military education and training in China
Universities and colleges in Shanghai
Medical schools in China
Educational institutions established in 1949
1949 establishments in China